Denis O'Hearn is a Professor of Sociology and Anthropology at the University of Texas at El Paso (previously he served as Professor of Sociology, Binghamton University, SUNY, 2006-2016 (Chair 2014-16) and Professor of Social and Economic Change, Queen's University Belfast, 2003-2008). He has written widely in the fields of political economy, mutual aid, isolated imprisonment and Ireland.

Selected publications
 O'Hearn, Denis (1998) Inside the Celtic Tiger: the Irish economy and the Asian model, Pluto Press
 O'Hearn, Denis (2001) The Atlantic Economy: Britain, the US and Ireland, Manchester University Press
 O'Hearn, Denis (2000) Globalization,“New Tigers,” and the end of the developmental State? The case of the celtic tiger, Politics & Society 28 (1), 67-92

References

American sociologists
Year of birth missing (living people)
Living people
University of Texas at El Paso faculty